Al Hasnaa (Arabic: Belle) is an Arabic language women's magazine based in Beirut, Lebanon. The magazine has been in circulation since 1909.

History and profile
Al Hasnaa was launched by Georges Nicholas Baz in 1909. Baz was also the founding editor-in-chief of the magazine which was based in Beirut. The constitutional reforms in the Ottoman Empire in 1908 made it possible to establish the magazine providing a flexible atmosphere for the publications. 

One of the early contributors was Esther Azhari Moyal, a Lebanese Jewish journalist, feminist, and translator. In 1968 Alia Al Solh, a daughter of Riad Al Solh, was appointed editor-in-chief of the magazine. Alawia Sobh served as the editor-in-chief of the magazine who was appointed to the post in 1986.

References

External links

1909 establishments in the Ottoman Empire
Arabic-language magazines
Magazines established in 1909
Magazines published in Beirut
Women's magazines
History of women in Lebanon